1967 Menzel is a stony background asteroid from the inner regions of the asteroid belt, approximately  in diameter. It was discovered on 1 November 1905, by German astronomer Max Wolf at Heidelberg Observatory in southern Germany, and later named after American astrophysicist Donald Howard Menzel.

Classification and orbit 

Menzel is a stony S-type asteroid that orbits the Sun in the inner main-belt at a distance of 1.9–2.5 AU once every 3 years and 4 months (1,219 days). Its orbit has an eccentricity of 0.14 and an inclination of 4° with respect to the ecliptic. The body's observation arc begins with its first used observation at Goethe Link Observatory in 1965, or 60 years after its official discovery, with a number of unused observations previously made at Heidelberg.

Naming 

This minor planet was named after American astrophysicist Donald Howard Menzel (1901–1976), who was the director of the Harvard College Observatory and a pioneer in theoretical and observational astrophysics. Menzel, a mentor of several prolific astronomers, calculated Atomic Transition Probabilities, analysed the composition of stars from their spectra, studied the physics of gaseous nebulae and the Sun's chromosphere, observed solar eclipses, and measured the rotation period of Uranus and Neptune by means of spectroscopy. Menzel was also popular for debunking UFO sightings. The official  was published by the Minor Planet Center on 18 April 1977.

Physical characteristics 

Between September 2005 and November 2015, a total of least 10 rotational lightcurves were obtained for this asteroid from photometric observations from several observatories all over the world. They all gave a concurring, well-defined rotation period of 2.83–2.84 hours with a brightness variation between 0.24 and 0.39 magnitude.().

According to the space-based survey carried out by the NEOWISE mission of NASA's Wide-field Infrared Survey Explorer, Menzel measures between 9.6 and 10.2 kilometers in diameter and its surface has an albedo between 0.21 and 0.25. The Collaborative Asteroid Lightcurve Link derives a typical albedo for stony asteroids of 0.21 and a diameter of 10.1 kilometers, with an absolute magnitude of 12.25.

Notes

References

External links 
 Asteroid Lightcurve Database (LCDB), query form (info )
 Dictionary of Minor Planet Names, Google books
 Asteroids and comets rotation curves, CdR – Observatoire de Genève, Raoul Behrend
 Discovery Circumstances: Numbered Minor Planets (1)-(5000) – Minor Planet Center
 
 

001967
Discoveries by Max Wolf
Named minor planets
19051101